Persicaria runcinata is a species of flowering plant in the family Polygonaceae, native to the eastern Himalayas and Myanmar. It was first described in 1825 as Polygonum runcinata.

References

runcinata
Flora of East Himalaya
Flora of Myanmar
Plants described in 1825